Pararhizophagus grouvellei is a species of beetles in the family Monotomidae, the only species in the genus Pararhizophagus.

References

Monotomidae
Monotypic Cucujoidea genera